Bombus is the first full-length album by Swedish heavy metal band Bombus. It was released on 26 May 2010 by Mourningwood Recordings.

Track listing

Personnel
 Feffe – Guitars, vocals
 Matte – Guitars, vocals
 Peter –	Drums
 Ulf – Bass

References

2010 debut albums
Bombus (band) albums
Century Media Records albums